Hibbertia aspera, commonly known as rough guinea flower, is a species of flowering plant in the family Dilleniaceae and is endemic to eastern Australia. It is an ascending or erect shrub with low-lying or scrambling branches, oblong to lance-shaped or egg-shaped leaves with the narrower end towards the base, and yellow flowers with four to six stamens in a single group, joined at the base.

Description
There are two carpels each containing two ovules. Flowering mainly occurs from September to December.

Taxonomy
Hibbertia aspera was first formally described in 1817 by Swiss botanist Augustin Pyramus de Candolle in Regni Vegetabilis Systema Naturale from specimens collected by George Caley. The specific epithet (aspera) means "rough to the touch".

In 1998, Hellmut R. Toelken described two subspecies in the Journal of the Adelaide Botanic Gardens, and the names are accepted by the Australian Plant Census:
H. aspera DC. subsp. aspera; 
H.aspera subsp. pilosifolia Toelken has star-like hairs with fewer branches than those on the autonym. The type specimen of this subspecies was collected on the Atherton Tablelands.

Distribution and habitat
Rough guinea flower grows on sandy or gravelly soils in woodland, open forest and heath in Queensland, New South Wales and Victoria. In New South Wales it mainly occurs in coastal areas and in Victoria is restricted to Gippsland. Subspecies pilosifolia does not occur in Victoria.

References

aspera
Flora of New South Wales
Flora of Queensland
Flora of Victoria (Australia)
Plants described in 1817
Taxa named by Alphonse Pyramus de Candolle